Cimon del Froppa (2,932m) is the highest peak of the Marmarole range in the Dolomites in Veneto, north-eastern Italy. 
The mountain is rarely climbed, as it is somewhat overshadowed by its higher neighbours Antelao and Sorapiss. The usual route is from the south.

References

Mountains of Veneto
Mountains of the Alps
Dolomites